Eucalyptus ammophila, commonly known as the sandplain red gum, is a mallee that is endemic to central and southern Queensland. It has rough fibrous bark near the base and smooth greyish and orange to bronze bark higher up. It has lance-shaped leaves, yellow or creamy flower buds in groups of between seven and eleven, white flowers and hemispherical fruit with strongly raised valves.

Description
The trunk has rough, fibrous, greyish brown bark and the upper parts of the trunk and the branches have smooth greyish and orange to bronze-coloured bark. Both sides of the leaf are the same dull green, although bluish green at first.

Taxonomy and naming
Eucalyptus ammophila was first formally described in 1994 by Ian Brooker and Andrew Slee from a specimen collected in the Maranoa region of Queensland, and the description was published in the journal Austrobaileya. The specific epithet (ammophila) means "sand-loving".

Distribution and habitat
The sandplain red gum grows on red or orange sandplains in central and southern Queensland, including areas near Charleville, Yalleroi Jericho and the White Mountains.

See also
List of Eucalyptus species

References

ammophila
Myrtales of Australia
Flora of Queensland
Taxa named by Ian Brooker
Plants described in 1994